Estadio Sergio Torres is a multi-purpose stadium in Usulután, El Salvador.  It is currently used mostly for football matches and is the home stadium of Luis Ángel Firpo. The stadium holds 5,000 people.

History
Located in the Barrio La Parroquia, the stadium is an exception in El Salvador's professional soccer:  Firpo is the only team in First Division that plays in its own stadium.  
Firpo's first president, Mr. Gustavo Demis, bought two thirds of the stadium and,
In 1950, the then president, Mr. Juan Boillat, bought the other third.  
A curious note:  Between 1960 and 1970 Mr. Gilberto Napoleon Flores Huezo, one of Firpo's higher ups, made an effort to remodel the stadium's walls and seats, but, it would seem, at the expense of the team - Firpo, in those same years, was going up and down between the First and Second Division .

Name
In 1997, The stadium was renamed after the legendary former owner and president of the team—the stadium known as Usulután Stadium became known as Sergio Torres Rivera Stadium in Usulután.

References

Football venues in El Salvador
Multi-purpose stadiums in El Salvador
C.D. Luis Ángel Firpo
Sports venues completed in 1930
1930 establishments in El Salvador